Anne Haddy (5 October 1930 – 6 June 1999), credited also as Anne Hardy, was a retired Australian actress, television presenter and voice artist, who worked in various facets of the industry including radio, stage and television. She was married to actor and scriptwriter James Condon.

Haddy appeared in numerous television films early in her career, but was better known for her television soap opera/serials roles, starting with numerous roles in Crawford Production serials, she had a stint in cult series Prisoner, as Alice Hemmings and a permanent role in Sons and Daughters as Rosie Andrews.

She was best known however for her long-running role in the soap Neighbours as matriarch Helen Daniels, spanning twelve years and some 1,661 episodes.

Anne was also a renowned children's entertainer: she was an original presenter on Play School and also a voice artist, having provided her voice in some films from the animated Dot series.

Early life
Haddy was born on 5 October 1930 in Quorn, South Australia. She attended Adelaide High School.
By 1949 she was a member of Theatres Associated, playing Ah, Wilderness! under Margery Irving at Stow Hall. through to 1953 with Cocteau's The Typewriter. 
She acted in radio plays and school broadcasts while she was working in Adelaide University's book room. She later attended the Sydney Theatre Company.

She relocated to the United Kingdom in the 1950s to find acting work, but ended up working as a secretary for Kellogg's. She married her first husband, Max Dimmitt, before returning to Australia, where she gave birth to two children. In 1960, Haddy and her family moved to Sydney. In 1977 Haddy married actor and scriptwriter James Condon, her marriage to Dimmitt having been dissolved. They acted alongside each other twice, both during Haddy's tenure on Neighbours.

Career
Haddy became one of the first presenters of Play School, a show that has launched the career of many Australian soap stars. She appeared in numerous made-for-television movies in the 1960s, as well as taking guest roles in serials throughout the 1960s and early 1970s including Wandjina! (1966 Australian Television series), Dynasty (the 1970–71 Australian television series), and Punishment. From the late 1970s onwards her roles in TV soaps where more prominent, with her first major permanent role was in the series Prisoner, where she played Doreen Anderson's mother, who having abandoned Doreen as a youngster, returns to visit her revealing she has terminal cancer. In 1982 until 1985 she played housemaid Rosie Andrews (later Palmer) in Sons and Daughters, before in 1985 taking on her longest and most famous regular role, as series matriarch Helen Daniels, in Neighbours a role she would appear in for the 12 years, racking up 1,162 episodes. At the time of her exit she was the longest serving actor and the only actor who had been with the show since the very first episode.

Personal life and death
Haddy suffered ill health for the last two decades of her life. She suffered a heart attack in 1979, leading to four bypass operations. Shortly thereafter, she fell and broke her hip, and later learned she had stomach cancer, which was reportedly discovered early and successfully treated surgically. In 1983, she had one of her four heart bypasses unclogged. Further health problems and a broken hip led to kidney trouble, which caused her to retire from acting in 1997. Haddy had remarked that she would like to have her real-life funeral screened as part of Neighbours.

She died at her home in Melbourne from a kidney related illness on 6 June 1999, aged 68. In the UK, the episode of Neighbours that was broadcast on BBC One the following day ended with a dedication to her memory, accompanied by an announcement of her death.

Awards and honours
Her portrayal of the character Helen Daniels in Neighbours won her the Penguin Award for Sustained Performance by an Actor in a Series in 1987.

In 1988, Haddy was honoured by Oxford University undergraduates who made her an honorary member of the university's Corpus Christi College.

Filmography

FILM

TELEVISION

References

External links

1930 births
1999 deaths
Australian film actresses
Australian soap opera actresses
Australian radio actresses
People from Quorn, South Australia
20th-century Australian actresses
Australian children's television presenters
Australian women television presenters
Actresses from South Australia
People educated at Adelaide High School